The Korean ruling class refers to persons in contemporary South Korean society known for holding multiple offices in government, education, and the chaebol, stressing degrees from elite (especially American) universities, and reserving important positions for one another and their family members. According to social theory, this class protects and perpetuates itself by valuing family background, prestigious education, loyalty to friends/classmates/hometown, and chaebol wealth, while those excluded from the class are unable to access these prerequisites for class membership. Leaders of admired institutions, such as Samsung, are often insulated from criticism, but there is occasionally popular backlash against the perceived abuses of the elite class, such as the 2014 Korean Air "nut rage" scandal.

The idea of a contemporary Korean ruling class has an important basis in the historical stratification of Korean society, but the exact function of the historical connection is a topic of debate. Prior to the 20th century, the dynastic traditions of Confucianism and the historical legacy of the yangban shaped the Korean aristocracy. On the one hand, the parallels can be seen today in the prestige of elite educational credentials, the wealth of landowners in South Korea's tight real estate market, as well as Confucian ideals of paternalism and loyalty to social connections formed during youth. On the other hand, the parallels are at best symbolic and at worst misleading. As a result of over 35 years of Japanese occupation and the subsequent Korean war, the older Korean polity and its traditions were broken off.

Historical background

Buddhist monks in comparison to medieval monastic power
As monastic orders did during the Europe's Middle Ages, the Buddhist monks became the purveyors and guardians of Korea's literary traditions while documenting Korea's written history and legacies from the Silla period to the end of the Goryeo dynasty. Korean buddhist monks also developed and used the first movable metal type printing presses in history—some 50 years before Gutenberg—to print ancient buddhist texts. Buddhist monks also engaged in record keeping, food storage and distribution, as well as the ability to exercise power by influencing the Goryeo royal court.

Bone Rank System of Silla

The bone rank system was the system of aristocratic rank used in the ancient Korean kingdom of Silla. It was used to segregate society, and particularly the layers of the aristocracy, on the basis of their hereditary proximity to the throne and the level of authority they were permitted to wield. The idea of royal blood in other societies is a close analogue to the idea of sacred bone in Silla thought. Bone rank was strictly hereditary, and thus acted as a caste system.

Korean ruling classes in the Goryeo dynasty

Neo-Confucian Joseon period yangban leadership

The yangban Confucian scholars grew to prominence during the Joseon dynasty period. From the late 14th century onwards, the yangban class formed the administrative backbone of the Korean nation. They occupied the highest echelon of social caste system.

Japanese colonial rule period
The annexation of Korea by Japan from 1905 to 1945 ushered in not only a harsh colonial period wherein the Japanese took over and dominated every aspect of Korea's sociopolitical, cultural and economic life, it created a demand for Koreans skilled in working alongside the Japanese as petty bureaucrats, minor officials, junior administrators, clerks and low-level public officials such as policemen, station masters, railroad engineers, and army officers. This fostered the need and creation of a skilled indigenous workforce trained and schooled in Japanese ways and methods. Although small in number, this elite group of Koreans represented the first generation of Korean yuhaksaeng(유학생), or overseas students, to be sent abroad for foreign study. From 1910 to 1945 these Koreans studied mostly in Japan's best high schools and universities, especially Tokyo Imperial University. While many overseas Korean students were forcibly conscripted into the Imperial Japanese Army to fight against the allies, many survived the war mostly by being able to evade routine roundups by the Japanese police, usually with the help of sympathetic Japanese teachers and mentors. After Korea's liberation from Japan on August 15, 1945, they immediately were called upon to form Korea's first provisional government in conjunction with a U.S.-administered trusteeship. As they represented the only class of Koreans who were capable of administering the newly formed Republic of Korea upon its establishment in 1948, they became the de facto inheritors of the Japanese colonial system and founders of the first sovereign Korean state in modern times. Among their ranks were a generation's worth of Japanese-trained and educated bureaucrats, administrators, technocrats, military and business leaders, e.g., Park Chung-hee, Lee Byung-chul, etc. In toto, these trailblazers who were educated in Japan during the colonial period, became the founding members of the Republic of Korea as well as movers and shakers in Korean politics and business all the way up till the late 1980s. Collectively, this generation is called the Japanese Generation.

Japanese Occupation and The Korean War to the start of South Korea's true beginning of democracy 
The South Korean process of civil government following the Japanese Occupation and the Korean War did undergo change as it was the end of the country’s long history of how the country had been ruled. The three kingdoms that originated became united when a new kingdom rose and began the era of The Koryo Dynasty. When the fall of The Koryo Dynasty occurred, a new Dynasty rose, The Chosun Dynasty. The end of the Chosun Dynasty was the beginning of the Japanese Occupation and subsequently the Korean War. Those two events brought an end to kingdoms and dynasties but did not break the traditions of the Korean people.

The people of Korea regained their independence and went about setting up a new form of polity while still respecting their heritage and taking great pride in their culture. The 1960’s did not see an increase in “millionaires and soon to be billionaires” the nation exploded into civil chaos as their formation of government was still in its infancy stages. During this time in South Korea President Rhee had no desire to leave his position and forced a constitutional amendment which kept him from having to abide by the constitution and become reelected in 1956and again in 1960, this is what sparked the civil unrest within the country. This unrest however was the reason President Rhee resigned allowing Heo Jeong to assume the presidency and maintain order within the country until proper elections could be held, once again giving the people of South Korea their independence and ability to choose those whom they have deemed worthy to represent the country.  

Unfortunately, the suppression of the South Korean people did not end there. Between the years of 1961 and 1987 the people of South Korean were under the rule of a man who assumed complete power of the country and its affairs. 1971 General Park Chung-hee became president and issued a new constitution where the president would remain in office for life, it resembled the beginning of a new take on the old ways of Korea. With individuals fiercely fighting this change, Park began declaring declarations that further suppressed the people of South Korea. Criticism of him, his politics, or policies were banned and the right to choose who represented the people was once again taken away from the country. It did not end there however, following the assassination of Park Chung-hee things in the country were more than chaotic. The president who was finally elected in 1979 was replaced by Chun Doo-hwan in 1980. This is when the people of South Korea began to raise their voices. Chun Doo-hwan declared martial law which caused enormous demonstrations by the people, motivating the closure of universities and placing bans on gatherings of political nature. Its because of a student movement that the end of Chun Doo-hwan was finally seen in 1987 and the governments choice of leadership, Roh Tae-Woo, became elected as president.

Roh’s presidency began to reunite the country, bring back democracy and the start of stronger ties diplomatically with other nations. The man who followed Roh however, made the greatest change of all, because of him the country finally became open to the rest of the world, and that man was Kim Young-sam, the first civilian the people of South Korea had as their president in 30 years.

The business and ‘ruling’ class of the South Korean people took time. They underwent a recession in 2012 which had a devastating impact on their economy. As of today, the economy “South Korea’s economic freedom score is 74.0, making its economy the 24th freest in the 2021 Index (The Heritage Foundation, 2021).”

Business elites and ruling classes
Korea's first group of business, political and academic elites was the Japanese Generation, or specifically, those Koreans born during the waning days of the Joseon dynasty or the early years of the colonial period, who were trained and educated exclusively in Japan at elite universities and military academies during the Japanese colonial period from 1910 to 1945. This first generation of Korean overseas students, who as returnees to their native country after Korea's liberation from Japan in 1945, were called upon to form the first sovereign Korean state in modern history. Their studies in administration, agriculture and engineering and other subjects that the Japanese had deemed useful in the creation of a Korean administrative sub-class, were quickly put to use in filling the administrative void and power vacuum left behind by the departing Japanese colonial government.

By quickly assuming key technical and administrative positions in South Korea's fledgling government and bureaucracy, as well as assuming leadership in its post-colonial military and police force at the behest of U.S. trusteeship, Korea's Japanese Generation proved themselves as quick learners adept at jump starting Korea's ancient tradition of self-rule. These Koreans were also instrumental in forming, creating and leading Korea's post-war governmental institutions and driving its export-oriented economy well into the 1990s.

Today, near the end of the first decade of the 21st century, while a majority of the Japanese Generation has long since retired or passed on, their legacy continues to drive Korea's sociopolitical and economic scene for the time being, albeit less and less so. Meanwhile, increasing numbers of overseas educated Koreans—this time trained in the West and fluent in English—continue to return to Korea after their studies in overwhelming numbers seeking commensurate positions in Korea's public and private sector in order to establish their own imprimatur on Korean society based on their own experiences and learning acquired during their stints abroad as students studying at some of the best universities in America and Europe.

The overall impact of such disparate experiences in terms of influencing Korea's sociopolitical geography and economic milieu for the future is debatable though, as the current generation differs substantially from its predecessors. Specifically, Korea's current generation, although better educated and more privileged in many respects, lack a defining and unifying experience for their generation. The Japanese Generation, on the other hand was largely successful in terms of acting as Korea's legitimate power elites because they were able to quickly coalesce by capitalizing on the defining and unifying experience of their generation, which was the strong resentment of Korea's poverty and low status attributed to Japanese colonization and the Korean War. As a result, that generation felt an overwhelming obligation to put Korea on the right track at all costs, in order to prevent another return to an abysmal state.

Technocrat elites and ruling classes
Technocrats with degrees in the sciences or engineering have mostly been subsumed in power and influence in the political process, but have contributed to great success in the larger manufacturing combines, energy and resource cartels, chaebols, and cross-linked industries.

Tele-com and internet elites and ruling classes
By 2005, a new ruling elite spurred by telecommunications and the internet had come into being: and English studies abroad fell, with a new class of elite studying in China, and planning on extensive business dealings with China upon graduation. At the same time because of the similarity of the Turkic languages to Korean, there have been extensive links with Mongolia launching new elites who will base their fortunes upon export and development in this region.

The Korean rich list
There is currently no published Korean rich list, despite the Wikipedia entry, but Forbes and other chroniclers of the power elites of the world have found sufficient high profile rich in Korea as to generate accurate numbers.

Forbes magazine has hinted at Korea having at the very least 7 high billionaires living on the peninsula, and at least ten families alone who control in the high billions in assets. There are possibly another 5 Korean billionaires abroad, mostly in the USA who maintain dual citizenship.

Low billionaire families are generally accepted to number more than 10 and less than 20; while domestic newspapers have indicated that there are at least 100 families who have more than $250 million in assets: primarily real estate and land being developed; or in manufacturing who have a high enough profile as to be reasonably defined as amongst the very wealthy of the world.

Estimates on the number of Koreans who own more than a million US dollars in assets apart from their houses, and discarding all debts, are figured to be in the range of 65,000 high-net-worth individuals (HNWI) according to Merrill Lynch research by June 16, 2004. Article cited below.

Amongst the historically most powerful business elite leaders have been:

 Chung Ju-yung (정주영)
 Chung Mong-hun (정몽헌)
 Kim Woo-jung (김우중)
 Kim Yong-san (김용산)
 Lee Byung-chul (이병철)

See also
List of billionaires
Korean rich list
List of famous Koreans
Yangban

References and Notes

External links
  Number of Korean millionaires increases. Study cites 65,000 high-net-worth individuals in Korea
   Secrets of Korean real estate millionaires, 110 multi-millionaire Korean real estate investors identified, and interviewed
 Daewoo billionaire story
 Forbes Asian rich list 2002
 Biography of the Hyundai group and Chung Ju Yung, includes billionaire Chung's attempt to win a position in the 1992 presidential elections
      Kim Jeong-Hoon biography

Society of Korea